Nesticus furtivus, the Crystal Caverns cave spider, is a species of true spider in the family Nesticidae. It is found only in Raccoon Mountain Caverns, formerly Crystal Caverns, a commercial cave in Chattanooga, Tennessee, United States.

References

Nesticidae
Articles created by Qbugbot
Spiders described in 1984
Spiders of the United States